KBVU-FM (97.5 FM, "The Edge") is a commercial radio station licensed to serve the community of Alta, Iowa.  KBVU-FM is owned by Buena Vista University and broadcasts from there as well in Storm Lake. KBVU broadcasts an alternative rock format.

In November 1997, KBVU-FM started broadcasting from the KAYL tower located on the east side of Storm Lake.

External links
 

BVU-FM
Buena Vista University
Radio stations established in 1997
1997 establishments in Iowa